Alveston is a village and former civil parish, now in the parish of Stratford-upon-Avon, and around  north-east of Stratford town centre, in the Stratford-on-Avon district, in the county of Warwickshire, England. It is located to the south of, and within a bend of the River Avon. In 1951 the parish had a population of 2659.

Hemingford House there is the youth hostel for Stratford-upon-Avon. The village was represented by Alveston F.C. between 1924 and 2017, when they folded. For most of its history, the club played in the Stratford & District League and the Midland Football Combination.

Alveston was the home of the playwright J B Priestley and his wife Jacquetta Hawkes, who lived at Kissing Tree House in the village, in his later years, until his death in 1984. The house was called Avonmore in the 1901 census and his secretary lived in Avonmore Cottage which is still there in Kissing Tree Lane.

On 1 April 1974 the parish was abolished and merged with Stratford upon Avon.

References

External links
 
 

Villages in Warwickshire
Former civil parishes in Warwickshire
Stratford-upon-Avon